Frederick William Armytage (1838-1912)  was an Australian pastoralist.  He was the sixth son of George Armytage.

He was born on 17 October 1838 in Bagdad, Tasmania.  His family moved to Geelong, Victoria in 1851 and he was educated at the Diocesan Grammar School, now Geelong Grammar.

He acquired Wooloomanata Station from his father and acquired additional properties in New South Wales and Queensland.  He was associated with the development of the frozen meat export industry.

He died in Melbourne on 3 September 1912.

References

1838 births
1912 deaths
Australian farmers